Raymond Rock (October 1, 1922 – January 22, 2016) was a Canadian politician and a businessman. He was elected Member of Parliament for the Liberal Party representing the riding of Jacques-Cartier—Lasalle in the 1962 federal election and later represented the riding of Lachine. Rock physically crossed the floor in 1972 to join the Progressive Conservatives and was subsequently defeated in the 1972 election. Raymond Rock crossed the floor because he had received a communique from the Liberal Party that no anglophones in Quebec should be employed by the Federal Government, no matter how bilingual. He also sat on various standing committees. Rock was a member of the Royal Canadian Naval Volunteer Reserve in which he served on HMCS Portage between 1942 and 1945. A businessman and owner of a hardware store, he also served as alderman in Lachine, Quebec (1951–55 and 1957–63) as well as President of the Lachine Chamber of Commerce. He died in January 2016 at the age of 93.

Rock's parents, John Rock and Helena Pietzik were both of Polish descent. With his wife, Theresa Kudla, he had two children, Allan Eric Rock (1952–2010) and Kenneth Lester Rock (1956–2009).

References

External links 
 

1922 births
2016 deaths
Businesspeople from Montreal
Canadian military personnel of World War II
Liberal Party of Canada MPs
Members of the House of Commons of Canada from Quebec
Montreal city councillors
People from Lachine, Quebec
Progressive Conservative Party of Canada MPs